KKBD (95.9 FM) is a commercial radio station located in Sallisaw, Oklahoma, broadcasting to the Fort Smith, Arkansas area. KKBD airs a classic rock music format branded as "Big Dog 95.9".

References

External links
KKBD official website

KBD
Classic rock radio stations in the United States
Radio stations established in 1972
1992 establishments in Oklahoma
IHeartMedia radio stations